Asura griseata is a moth of the  family Erebidae. It is found in China.

References

griseata
Moths described in 1899
Moths of Asia